Hamamelidaceae, commonly referred to as the witch-hazel family, is a family of flowering plants in the order Saxifragales.  The clade consists of shrubs and small trees positioned within the woody clade of the core Saxifragales. An earlier system, the Cronquist system, recognized Hamamelidaceae in the Hamamelidales order.

Description 

The Hamamelidaceae are distinguishable from other families in the Saxifragales due to the range of floral characteristics that are generally uniform though all genera.  Uniform characteristics include stipules borne on stems with leaves often 2-ranked. Genera usually have a two carpel gynoecium, although some species show variation.  Other characteristics include a multicellular stigma, with shallow papillae or ridges.

Anthers
Anther structure and the modes of opening are considered to be one of the most important features in the systematics and evolution of hamamelids.  The anthers in Hamamelids are on average shorter than in other families in the Saxifragales. The anther valve openings are unique pleismorphic features that contrast with the simple longitudinal slits of the anthers in the upper Hamamelidae where the pollen is predominantly wind-driven.

The three types of anthers found in the Hamamelidaceae are:

 Type 1) The theca (or sheath of anther) opens like a window with two wings; a common anther type.
 Type 2) There is one valve opening to reveal two pollen sacs.  Five genera in the Hamamelidoideae subfamily, confined to the Southern Hemisphere (Trichcladus, Dicoryphe, Ostrearia, Neostrearia, Noahdendron) are known to have this anther type.
 Type 3) One valve opens a wing of anther tissue towards the center of the flower revealing one pollen sac.  The two genera, Exbucklandia and Hamamelis is known to have this anther type.

Pollen

Plants of the Hamamelidaceae have sticky pollen, which may have influenced the type of pollination that is seen in this family.  Pollination is predominantly via insects or wind.  However, the insect-pollinated genus Disanthus has been known to wind-pollinate (although inefficiently) in the event pollinators do not visit its flowers. The genus Rhodoleia is unique because it is bird-pollinated.

The pollen structure in the lower Hamamelidae is relatively uniform.  The pollen patterns are tricolpate with reticulate exines.

Flowers

The petals of the Hamamelidaceae are generally narrow and ribbon-like.  The exceptions are the genera Corylopsis and Rhodoleia, which have spathulate or circular-like petals.

The flowers of Hamamelidaceae are mostly bisexual with perianth parts, which mature to fruits arranged in spikes, racemes or nonglobose heads.

Breeding systems

The anemophilous groups within the Hamamelidaceae are often andromonoecious. Self-incompatibility is common, but self-compatibility occurs in some genera such as Hamamelis.

Taxonomy 

The fossil record dates from the Eocene. Hamamelidaceae was established by Brown in 1818 as the Hamamelideae, including four genera. The phylogenetic relationship of the Hamamelidaceae have been revisited several times since the first comprehensive classification of the family in 1930. This was clarified in 1998 by the molecular phylogenetic work of the Angiosperm Phylogeny Group (APG) which placed the family within the eudicot order Saxifragales. In doing so, it separated one of the existing subfamilies, the Altingioideae, which formed the basal group, into its own family within the order, the Altingiaceae.

Subdivision

Subfamilies 

The infrafamilial classification of the Hamamelidaceae has been controversial, and has undergone a number of revisions based on morphology, the best known of which are those of Harms (1930) and Endress (1989).

Morphological and DNA studies have supported monophyly of the Hamamelidoideae and have recognized the separation of the Rhodoleioideae and Disanthoideae subfamily and newly erected Mytilarioideae.

The relationships between Exbucklandioideae and the other subfamilies have proven controversial.  The unresolved monophyly of Exbucklandioideae and the clades of Disanthoideae, Rhodoleioideae, Exbucklandioideae or even Mytilarioideae being a sister clade to Hamamelidoideae may have been a result of differing DNA methodologies researchers have used to produce phylogenetic trees and the inclusion or exclusion of certain genera used as outgroups in their analyses.  However, the sister relationship of Disanthoideae and Hamamelidoideae has been well supported, although some researchers do not support this.  Strong support for making Altingioideae a family has been recognized by textbooks and the Angiosperm Phylogeny Group.  Research continues to resolve the deep relationships of the subfamilies within the Hamamelidaceae by incorporating whole or fragmentary fossil evidence.

Hamamelidaceae contains 27-30 genera and 80-140 species distributed among five to six subfamilies.  The subfamilies are Exbucklandioideae, Rhodoleioideae, Mytilarioideae, Disanthoideae, Hamamelidoideae, and Altingioideae, which has been elevated to a family Altingiaceae in some recent treatments. Many of the subfamilies are monotypic and the majority of the species lie within the Hamamelidoideae, which has 22 genera.

The long-standing question of whether Altingioideae should be a separate family has been assessed and supported by morphological and molecular phylogenetic studies.
The resulting subfamilial structure was eventually resolved in a series of molecular studies in the late 1990s, resulting in five distinct subfamilies, the majority of the genera residing in the nominative subfamily, Hamamelidoideae:
Subfamilies (number of genera)
 Exbucklandioideae (1 genus; Exbucklandia)
 Rhodoleioideae (1 genus; Rhodoleia)
 Mytilarioideae (2 genera; Mytilaria, Chunia)
 Disanthoideae (1 genus; Disanthus)
 Hamamelidoideae (22 genera; see Tribes below)

Tribes 

The relatively large size of subfamily Hamamelidoideae and its further subdivision into tribes has also been a matter of study and controversy. Six tribes are now recognized. The revised structure has greatly reduced Hamamelideae to a monotypic taxon, which had previously been further divided into subtribes:
 Corylopsideae (1 genus; Corylopsis)
 Dicorypheae (5 genera; Dicoryphe, Trichocladus, Neostrearia, Noahdendron, Ostrearia)
 Eustigmateae (4 genera; Eustigma, Fortunearia, Sinowilsonia, Molinadendron)
 Fothergilleae (7 genera;  Fothergilla, Parrotiopsis, Parrotia, Shaniodendron, Sycopsis, Distylium, Distyliopsis)
 Hamamelideae (1 genus; Hamamelis)
 Loropetaleae (4 genera; Loropetalum (including Tetrathyrium), Maingaya, Embolanthera, Matudaea)

Genera 

Chunia (1 species; Hainan)
Corylopsis (winter-hazel; about 30 species; east Asia)
Dicoryphe
Disanthus (1 species; east Asia)
Distyliopsis
Distylium (about 10 species; east Asia, Himalayas)
Embolanthera
Eustigma
Exbucklandia (3 species; Assam, China, southeast Asia)
Fortunearia (1 species; eastern China)
Fothergilla (fothergilla; 3 species; southeastern U.S.)
Hamamelis (witch-hazel; 4 species; eastern North America, east Asia)
†Langeria (Wolfe) & Wehr) Eocene 1 species
Loropetalum (three species; east Asia)
Maingaya
Matudaea
Molinadendron
Mytilaria
Neostrearia
Noahdendron
Ostrearia
Parrotia (Persian ironwood; 1 species; Alborz Mountains of southwest Asia)
Parrotiopsis (1 species; Himalaya)
Rhodoleia (about 7 species; southeast Asia)
Sinowilsonia (1 species; western China)
Sycopsis (about 7 species; southeast Asia)
Tetrathyrium
Trichocladus

Distribution and habitat 

The Hamamelidaceae were widely distributed in the Northern Hemisphere during the Upper Cretaceous and early Tertiary.
 Quaternary glaciation across the Northern Hemisphere caused the extinction of numerous species and the restricted distribution of others. Hamamelidaceae were obliterated from Europe along with numerous other genera of plants that were unable to escape the ice sheets due to geography (the Mediterranean Sea and Alps forming barriers that did not exist in North America and Asia)

The largest subfamily, the Hamamelidoideae, is now distributed in North America and western and eastern Asia.  The Hamamelidoideae subtribe Dicoryphinae is now restricted to the African (including Madagascar and Comores) and Australian continents.

Disanthoideae and Rhodoleioideae are now restricted to southern China and the Caucasus region.  Mytilarioideae is restricted to eastern Asia.  Altingioideae is now restricted to eastern Asia and western Asia and North America between central Mexico and Belize.

References

Bibliography

Books and theses

Articles 

 
 
 
 
 
 
 
 
 

APG

Websites 

 
  (see also Angiosperm Phylogeny Website)
 
 
 Hamamelidaceae  in L. Watson and M.J. Dallwitz (1992 onwards). The families of flowering plants. 

 
Saxifragales families